Nahid Niazi (born 26 February 1941) is a former Pakistani playback singer who performed in the Lollywood movies during the era of 1960s. She is wife of the musician Muslehuddin and sister of singer Najma Niazi. She is known for her playback songs, "Chali Re Chali Re Main To Des Piya Ke Chali Re", "Raat Saloni Ayi", and others.

Life and career
Nahid was born as Shahida Niazi on 26 February 1941. Her father Sajjad Sarwar Khan Niazi was a poet and musician, and was also a director at Radio Pakistan. He was also an uncle of the former cricketer and now politician Imran Khan.

Nahid started her career in 1957 by singing a song for the movie "Laila Majnu" under the music direction of Rashid Attre, while she was still a student at St Joseph's Convent School, Karachi. Though the first song she recorded was ‘Mil Gaya Dil ko qarar’ in Ayaz (1960) for Khawaja Khurshid Anwar though the film released later. One of her earlier songs was "Jaag taqdeer ko jaga loon gee" was composed by Muslehuddin for the film Aadmi (1958). She became well-known in both entertainment and mainstream music because of that song. Then Nahid's rendition of her father Sajjad Sarwar Niazi's poem "Ik baar phir kaho zara" was also much appreciated. In 1961, she became a well-known playback singer because by vocalizing a duet with Ahmed Rushdi, "Raat Saloni Aaye", again composed by Muslehuddin for the movie, "Zamana Kia Kahe Ga".

Moviegoers flocked to the theatres to watch the Urdu film "Daal mein kala" (1962) as soon as it was released because of the Nahid's song "Samajh na Aaye dilko kahan lay jaa oon sanam" (Musician: Muslehuddin).

She sang another duet with Ahmed Rushdi, "Raat ho gaye jawan" for the movie "Dil Nay Tujhay Maan Liya". The song "Husn bhi mauj mein hai" for the movie "Mujhay Jeenay Do" (1968) was recorded in the voice of Nahid and is one of her notable melodies.

When the song "Chum, chum, chum, milay hain sanam, lut gaye hum, Allah qasam" was first played on Radio Pakistan, Nahid touched peak of her singing career. Later, she recorded several songs during the short time she was a singer. Aside from Moslehuddin, Nahid rendered her voice for nearly all the notable composers of Lollywood film industry, including Rasheed Attre, Khwaja Khurshid Anwar, Nashad, Safdar Hussain, Rehman Verma, Saif Chughtai, Khalil Ahmed, Nisar Bazmi, Master Inayat Hussain, Robin Ghosh, Sohail Rana, and Saleem-Iqbal.

Personal life
Nahid married the music director Muslehuddin in January 1964, who had composed most of her songs. The couple left Pakistan for UK after 1971.

Television
Both Nahid Niazi and her husband Muslehuddin hosted a television musical show for children on PTV in the late 1960s.

Songography
Nahid sang more than 300 songs in Urdu, Punjabi, and Bengali languages, including both film and non-film tracks:

 "Mohe piya milan ko jaane de" — Movie: "Zehr-e-Ishq" (1958), Music: Khwaja Khurshid Anwar
 "Chali ray, chali ray, chali ray," picturized on Musarrat Nazir.
 "Sayyan jee ko dhoond nay chali jogun bun kay", picturized on Neelo, music by Safdar Hussain, film Naagin (1959)
 "Mohay piya Milan ko janay day", picturized on Musarrat Nazir.
 "Kaisa safar hai kahiye, yoon he qareeb rahiye" (duet: Nahid Niazi-Ahmed Rushdi).
 "Tujh ko maloom naheen.'
 "Na koi  sayyan  mera, na koi piya ray".
 "Aa tujh ko suna oon lori, halaat say chori chori".
 "Zamana pyar ka itna he kum hai, ye na jana tha"
 "Piya, piya, na cook papiha"
 "Raqs mein hai sara jahan"

References

External links

1941 births
Living people
Pakistani playback singers
Pakistani women singers
Pakistani television people
Recipients of the Pride of Performance